Ample Destruction is the first studio album released by American power metal band Jag Panzer, released in 1984. Originally released on Azra Records, a small independent label, it received poor marketing from the label, and thus became only an underground hit amongst the metal community, and was bootlegged repeatedly.

Songs

Album line-up
Harry Conklin – vocals
Mark Briody – guitar
Joey Tafolla – guitar
John Tetley – bass guitar
Rick Hilyard – drums

Re-issues
The album was re-issued officially twice by two different companies, though the track listings were the same, with three bonus tracks: "Black Sunday", "Eyes of the Night" and "Lying Deceiver".

There is also one other version of the album which includes four tracks from the Tyrants EP ("Battlezones", "Death Row", "Metal Melts with Ice" and "Iron Shadows"), one track from the Tyrants era ("Tower of Darkness") and four unreleased tracks from the Ample Destruction era ("Instrumental", "Black Sunday", "Eyes of the Night" and "Fallen Angel"). This version was marketed by Azra International and includes lyrics for all 18 tracks.

References

1984 albums
Jag Panzer albums
Metal Blade Records albums